Elizabeth Beall (née Davis) is an American screenwriter and television producer, best known for her work on the television series Castle.

Personal life
She married a fellow ex-Castle writer Will Beall in 2012.

Television filmography

Miscellaneous crew
Castle - story editor (2009–2010) and executive story editor (2010–2011) (credited as Elizabeth Davis)

Producer
Castle - co-producer (2011–2012; credited as Elizabeth Davis) and producer (2012–2014; credited as Elizabeth Beall)
Scorpion- co-executive producer (2014–2015; credited as Elizabeth Beall - 2015–2017 as Elizabeth Davis Beall)
Lethal Weapon (2017–2018) - co-executive producer (credited as Elizabeth Davis Beall)
The Rookie (2018–present) - co-executive producer (credited as Elizabeth Davis Beall)

Writer
The Rookie (2018–present) - Episodes: "The Roundup", "The Checklist"
Lethal Weapon (2017–2018) - Episodes: "Birdwatching", "The Odd Couple"
Scorpion (2014–2017)- Episodes: "Shorthanded," "Revenge," "Love Boat," "Tech, Drugs And Rock'N'Roll," "We're Gonna Need A Bigger Vote."
Castle (2009–2014) - (11 episodes: "Little Girl Lost", "One Man's Treasure", "Boom!", "Almost Famous", "One Life to Lose", "Heartbreak Hotel", "The Limey", "Cloudy with a Chance of Murder", "Under the Influence", "Need to Know", "Dressed to Kill")
Viva Laughlin (2007) - Episode: "Fighter"
Beautiful People (2005–2006) - Episodes: "Over Exposure", "Where Are We Now?"

References

External links
 

American television producers
American women television producers
American television writers
Living people
American women television writers
Place of birth missing (living people)
Year of birth missing (living people)
21st-century American women